was a town located in Kariwa District, Niigata Prefecture, Japan.

As of 2003, the town had an estimated population of 7,044 and a density of 81.76 persons per km². The total area was 86.15 km².

On April 1, 2005, Oguni, along with the village of Yamakoshi (from Koshi District), the town of Nakanoshima (from Minamikanbara District), and the towns of Koshiji and Mishima (both from Santō District), was merged into the expanded city of Nagaoka.

Transportation

Highway
 
 
 

Dissolved municipalities of Niigata Prefecture
Nagaoka, Niigata